Hard-Hat Domo is a DSiWare game that you use Domo as a construction worker to get to the top of a 100-floor building. It was made by Suzak. The game's goal is to match the ladder colors to the floor colors to get points. Sometimes, it is impossible to match both colors, but the game allows players to place a ladder as long as the ladder color and the color of the floor beneath him match. A level is cleared upon reaching the top floor. There is a timer that shows how many seconds until Wall Construction begins. Time is added to the timer when a ladder is placed. If the timer runs out, Wall Construction begins. If the Wall Construction catches up to Domo's current floor, he will lose one meat-and-potato stew bowl. If Domo loses all of his bowls, the game ends.

References

2009 video games
DSiWare games
Multiplayer and single-player video games
Nintendo DS games
Nintendo DS-only games
Puzzle video games
Suzak Inc. games
Video games developed in Japan